John F. Yancey also known as Uncle John Yancey (born 1826 Barren County, Kentucky, died May 7, 1903) was a Yellowstone National Park concessionaire who operated Yancey's Pleasant Valley hotel near Tower Junction in Yellowstone from 1882 until his death in 1903.

Early life
Very little is known about John Yancey's early life in Kentucky, although it is believed he was related in some way to William Lowndes Yancey, an Alabama politician and secessionist. Yancey was sixth of ten children and his parents moved to Missouri while he was a young boy where he grew to manhood. He participated in the American Civil War on the side of the Confederacy, but to what extent is unknown.  In the 1870s, shortly after the creation of Yellowstone National Park, he turned up as a prospector in the area of the Crevice Creek gold strike on the northern boundary of the park.  He apparently made enough money from prospecting to establish a way station on the Gardiner to Cooke City road inside the park in 1882.  Owen Wister, who met Yancey during a visit in 1896, described him as a "goat-bearded, shrewd-eyed, lank, Uncle Sam type".

Pleasant Valley Hotel
The valley lies adjacent to the Yellowstone River near the site of Barronett's Bridge and the confluence of the Lamar River. The valley was named by Philetus Norris, the second superintendent of the park (1877–82).

In 1882, then park superintendent Patrick Conger gave John Yancey verbal permission to establish a cabin in Pleasant Valley to enable him to provide accommodations and provisions to the stage traveling to and from Mammoth Hot Springs to Cooke City, Montana. The mining camps in Cooke City were well established and the route through Pleasant Valley was the only way in and out of Cooke City in winter.  In April 1884, the Department of the Interior granted Yancey a  lease in Pleasant Valley to establish a hotel.  Soon thereafter, Yancey constructed a five-room hotel he named" Yancey's Pleasant Valley Hotel.  Rooms were $2/day and $10/week with meals.  A guest of the hotel in 1901 described it thus:

Death

John F. Yancey was 77 years old in April 1903 when he traveled to Gardiner, Montana, to witness the dedication of the Roosevelt Arch by President Theodore Roosevelt on April 24, 1903. Although Yancey witnessed the dedication and apparently met President Roosevelt during the dedication ceremony, he caught a cold and died in Gardiner of pneumonia on May 7, 1903.

Yancey's obituary in the Livingston Post contained the following:

Gallery

References

1826 births
1903 deaths
People from Park County, Montana
Yellowstone National Park